Vera Samuilovna Krepkina (later Kalashnikova, ; born 15 April 1933) is a retired Russian track athlete who competed for the Soviet Union at the 1952, 1956 and 1960 Olympics. At all these Olympics she finished fourth in the 4 × 100 m relay and was eliminated in the heats of the 100 m sprint. In 1960 she also took part in the long jump and won a surprise gold medal with an Olympic record of 6.37 m, ahead of the defending champion Elżbieta Krzesińska and the world record holder Hildrun Claus.

At the European Championships she won gold medals in the 4 × 100 m relay in 1954 and 1958 and finished second in the 100 m in 1958. She was a member of the Soviet team that set a world record in the 4 × 100 m relay in 1956, and she tied the world record (11.3 seconds) in the 100 meter dash in 1958. During her career Krepkina won eight Soviet titles: 100 m in 1952, 1957 and 1958; 200 m in 1952; 4 × 100 m relay in 1952, 1960 and 1965; and 4 × 200 m relay in 1952. In retirement she worked as a children's athletics coach in Ukraine.

References

External links 
 

1933 births
Living people
People from Kirov Oblast
Soviet female long jumpers
Olympic athletes of the Soviet Union
Athletes (track and field) at the 1952 Summer Olympics
Athletes (track and field) at the 1956 Summer Olympics
Athletes (track and field) at the 1960 Summer Olympics
Olympic gold medalists for the Soviet Union
European Athletics Championships medalists
Medalists at the 1960 Summer Olympics
Olympic gold medalists in athletics (track and field)